Vagococcus silagei is a Gram-positive, haemolytic, non-spore-forming, facultatively anaerobic and non-motile bacterium from the genus of Vagococcus which has been isolated from Brewer's grain from Taiwan.

References 

Lactobacillales
Bacteria described in 2020